The Legislative Assembly of Alagoas (Portuguese: Assembleia Legislativa de Alagoas) is the unicameral legislative body of the government of the state of Alagoas in Brazil.

It consists of 27 state deputies. It is located in Maceió, Alagoas.

State legislatures of Brazil
Unicameral legislatures
Alagoas
Politics of Alagoas